Varun Ahuja is an Indian composer, singer-songwriter and a multi-instrumentalist. After being an integral part of the alternative rock act Cyanide, he toured with Aryans, an Indi-pop group of the 1990s known for hits like "Aankhon mein tera hi chehra" and "Yeh hawa kehti hai kya". Varun has collaborated and shared the stage with some of the most influential artists and has performed in over 2,000 shows over the last sixteen years.

In 2018, he released the singles "Alvida", featuring Lucky Ali, and "Bachke Tu Chalna", a duet featuring Shibani Kashyap.

References

20th-century Indian male singers
20th-century Indian singers
Indian composers
Living people
Year of birth missing (living people)
21st-century Indian male singers
21st-century Indian singers